Dolichancistrus cobrensis is a species of catfish in the family Loricariidae. It is native to South America, where it occurs in the Catatumbo River basin in the Lake Maracaibo drainage in Venezuela. The species reaches 7.9 cm (3.1 inches) SL.

References 

Ancistrini
Catfish of South America